The Lawrence Museum is a museum in Lawrence, New South Wales. It is situated in the former 2NR Broadcasting Station and operated by the Lawrence Historical Society.  The museum contains artefacts associated with the history of telecommunications and radio broadcasting in Australia.  It also contains photographs and artefacts related to the Lawrence Ferry.

History
On 12 June 2004, the Museum was officially opened, by regional news editor ABC Radio Allan Rawson.

References

Museums in New South Wales
Technology museums in Australia
Telecommunications museums